Ajay Chhetri (born 1 July 1999) is an Indian professional footballer who plays as a central midfielder for I-League club RoundGlass Punjab, on loan from Indian Super League club Bengaluru.

Career

Youth
Born in Kanglatongbi, Manipur, Chhetri joined Bengaluru FC's Academy in 2016. In 2018, Chhetri was selected to join Bengaluru's B side for their I-League 2nd Division and Bangalore Super Division campaigns. In December 2018, Chhetri was part of the Bengaluru B side that won the 2018–19 Bangalore Super Division.

Bengaluru
On 18 September 2018, it was announced that Chhetri, along with four other teammates from the Bengaluru B team, had been called up to join Bengaluru's squad for the 2018–19 Indian Super League season. He made his first-team debut for the club on 9 February 2019 against Chennaiyin. He came on as a 90th-minute substitute for Harmanjot Khabra as Bengaluru were defeated 2–1.

Hyderabad (loan)
On 7 January 2020, Bengaluru FC announced that Chhetri had been loaned to new Indian Super League franchise Hyderabad FC till the end of the season.

East Bengal (loan)
On 15 January 2021, East Bengal announced that they have signed Ajay Chhetri from Bengaluru on loan for the remained of the 2020-21 Indian Super League season. He made his debut on 15th January 2021, as he came on as a substitute to Milan Singh at half time as East Bengal drew 1–1 against Kerala Blasters.

Career statistics

Club

Honours

Bengaluru FC 'B' 
 Bangalore Super Division: 2018–19, 2019–20

Individual
 Bengaluru FC U-18 Player of the year: 2017

References

External links 
 Indian Super League profile.
 Bengaluru Football Club profile

1999 births
Living people
Footballers from Manipur
Indian Gorkhas
Indian footballers
Bengaluru FC players
East Bengal Club players
Association football midfielders
I-League 2nd Division players
Indian Super League players
I-League players
Hyderabad FC players